Chrysosyrphus latus  (Loew, 1863), the Variable Wrinklehead, is a rare species of syrphid fly observed in the eastern United states and widespread in Canada. Hoverflies can remain nearly motionless in flight. The adults are also known as flower flies for they are commonly found on flowers, from which they get both energy-giving nectar and protein-rich pollen. The larvae are unknown.

References

Eristalinae
Articles created by Qbugbot
Insects described in 1863
Taxa named by Hermann Loew